Johnny Lee may refer to:

Johnny Lee (actor) (1898–1965), American singer, dancer, voice actor and actor
Johnny Lee (computer scientist), American computer scientist
Johnny Lee (singer), (born 1946), American country singer

See also

John Lee (disambiguation)